Tetragnatha laboriosa, the silver longjawed orbweaver, is a species of long-jawed orb weaver in the spider family Tetragnathidae. It is found in North and Central America.

References

External links

 

Tetragnathidae
Articles created by Qbugbot
Spiders described in 1850